T. D. Dasan Std. VI B is a 2010 Indian Malayalam-language film written and directed by Mohan Raghavan and produced by Paul Vadukumcherry. The film deals with a child's desire to see his father, and the beginning is made when he gets a clue from a piece of paper he finds in his mother's trunk. The wanderings of the boy's mind and the real unravel of world which is a mix of dreams, desires and the present are portrayed in the movie.

The film features Master Alexander, Biju Menon, Jagadish and Shwetha Menon in the lead roles.
Master Alexander won the Best Child Actor award in an online poll conducted by The Times of India.
The film opened in Kerala theatres on 9 April 2010 to universal acclaim. It was screened at various international film festivals and has garnered several awards. Despite all the acclaim, the film performed poorly at the box office.

T. D. Dasan Std. VI B was the only film directed by Mohan Raghavan who died a year after the release of the film.

Plot
T. D. Dasan (Master Alexander) is a young boy who lives with his mother (Shwetha Menon). His father had left them years back when Dasan was an year old. Dasan gets his dad's address from his mother's old trunk box and writes him a letter.

Dasan's father had moved out of that address and the letter reaches the current resident Nandakumar Poduval (Biju Menon), an Ad film-maker who lives with his thirteen-year-old daughter Ammu (Tina Rose) in Bangalore. Nandan requests Ammu's caretaker Madhavan (Jagadish) to find out the whereabouts of the person and deliver the letter to him. But Madhavan is not that enthusiastic and the letter ends up in the waste bin. Ammu sees this and feels bad about it. She starts writing replies to Dasan, as if they were written to him by his dad. The young boy is excited at the thought of having found his dad, and shares all his feelings and needs with his dad. Ammu promptly replies with pens and other gifts Dasan asked his father.

Later Dasan's mother gets to know this and gets shattered by this news. Nandan also gets to know this news and becomes furious at his daughter, revealing that Dasan's father had actually died months ago while suffering from jaundice. He now wants to meet Dasan, apologize and tell him the truth. Dasan's mother was later found dead under mysterious circumstances. When Nandan comes to meet Dasan, he understands that Dasan is now an orphan, who was now under the care of his uncle Raman Kutty. Dasan meets Nandan, who now sees him as his father. Nandan first thinks of leaving the place without Dasan but changes his mind soon after.

Cast
 Master Alexander as T. D. Dasan
 Tina Rose as Ammu
 Biju Menon as Nandakumar Poduval
 Jagadish as Madhavan
 Shwetha Menon as Chandrika
 Valsala Menon as Ammumma
 Shruthy Menon as Megha
 Jagathy Sreekumar as Menon
 Suresh Krishna as Raman Kutty
 Mala Aravindan as Teacher
 Ottapalam Pappan
 Alosious Panikulangara as Baalu
 Sreehari as Advocate
 Dennis Parakkadan as Vagrant
 Gayathri

Reception
T. D. Dasan Std. VI B had an overwhelmingly positive reception from the critics. Paresh Palicha of Rediff.com said the movie "is miles ahead of the films that are served in the garb of entertainment week after week, and leaves us with a sense of elation. A brilliant effort indeed!"  This is what Nowrunning had to say. "Mohan Raghavan's debut film matches up in texture, dimension and depth to the wonderfully crafted films of Walter Salles that often transcend boundaries. This is the work of an artist who refuses to see the medium as a mere commodity, and the highly sensitive writing and truly marvelous direction make this film a captivating watch." Sify.com said "With no loud statements, buffoonery or gimmicks that we usually see in every other film, debutant director Mohan Raghavan's T D Dasan Std VI B' is a little gem that could perhaps shock you with its inherent honesty."

Indiaglitz also had given a glowing review for the movie. Despite the favourable critic opinion, the movie was a non-starter at the box-office. Budget constrains heavily limited the marketing of the movie, with the film ending up as a minuscule release. The collection was hardly noticeable.

The film was initially adjudged the Golden Pheasant Award for Best Film at the International Film Festival of Kerala 2010. However, it was decided to award a foreign film after some jury members felt that giving the award for a regional film will diminish the interest of foreign delegates in IFFK. The issue was revealed by actor P. Sreekumar in a press conference, which garnered wide criticism from the Malayalam film fraternity against the IFFK.

The film was one of the two South Indian films screened at the 11th New York Indian Film Festival (NYIFF 2011). The film won the award for the Best Screenplay at the festival.http://webmalayalee.com/portals/2011/05/12/malayalam-film-td-dasan-std-iv-b-won-the-best-screenplay-award-in-nyiff2011/ It was an official selection in the competition section for the Asian New Talent Award at the Shanghai International Film Festival.

Film festival participation
 Chennai International Film Festival
 FILCA Film Festival
 Habitat International Film Festival
 International Film Festival of Kerala
 New York Indian Film Festival
 Pune International Film Festival
 Shanghai International Film Festival

Awards
 Kerala State Film Awards
 Best Debut Director - Mohan Raghavan
 Second Best Actor - Biju Menon

 New York Indian Film Festival
 Best Screenplay - Mohan Raghavan

 John Abraham Award
 Best Film

 Kerala Film Critics Association Awards
 Best Story - Mohan Raghavan
 Best Child Artist-Master Alexander

 Asianet Film Awards
 Best Child Artist - Master Alexander

 World Malayali Council Awards
 Special Jury Award - Mohan Raghavan

 INSPIRE Awards
 Best Debutant Director - Mohan Raghavan
 Best Supporting Actress - Shweta Menon

 Amrita-FEFKA Film Awards
 Best Film
 Best Director - Mohan Raghavan
 Best Screen Play- (Mohan Raghavan)
 Best Child Artist-Master Alexander

 Jaihind TV Film Awards Kalaignar Tv film awards 
isaiaruvi film awards
 Best Screenplay (posthumous) - Mohan Raghavan
Mathrubhumi Film Awards
 Best Child Artist - Master Alexander
Times Of India Awards
 Best Child Artist - Master Alexander

References
Kalaignar film award 2011  Isaiaruvi award 2011

External links
 
 Prema Manmathan: Film Review, The Hindu''.

2010s Malayalam-language films
2010s children's drama films
2010 directorial debut films
Films scored by Sreevalsan J. Menon
2010 films
Indian children's drama films
2010 drama films